The 85th edition of the Tour of Flanders cycling classic in Belgium took place on 8 April 2001. It was won by Italian Gianluca Bortolami before Erik Dekker and Dennis Zanette.

Route
The race started on the Market Square in Bruges and finished in Meerbeke, covering 269 km.

There were sixteen categorized climbs:

Race Summary
Cycling News remarked that Bortolami won the race by outfoxing the favorites:

Final standings

External links
Race website
News report of the race

References

2001 Ronde van Vlaanderen
2001 in road cycling
Tour of Flanders
Tour Of Flanders
April 2001 sports events in Europe